The European U15 Badminton Championships is a tournament organized by the Badminton Europe (BE) since 2014 and is held once every two years to crown the best junior badminton players in Europe. The tournament is usually held alongside the European Men's and Women's Team Badminton Championships.

Championships

Medal count (2014 - 2020)

Past medalists

References

External links
European U15 Championship at Badminton Europe

U15
Under-15 sport
Youth badminton
badminton
2014 establishments in Europe
Recurring sporting events established in 2014